The Earlie Formation is a stratigraphic unit of Middle Cambrian age in the Western Canada Sedimentary Basin that is present beneath the plains of Alberta and eastern Saskatchewan. It was named for Earlie Lake in the County of Vermilion River, Alberta, by D.C. Pugh in 1971, who described the type section based on data from an oil well drilled in that area.

Lithology
The Earlie Formation consists of interbedded glauconitic siltstones and fine-grained sandstones and shales. The presence of glauconite indicates that the sediments were deposited in a marine environment.

Deposition and stratigraphic relationships
The Earlie Formation underlies the plains of Alberta and eastern Saskatchewan. It rests conformably on the unnamed basal sandstone unit that was deposited on the Precambrian rocks of the North American Craton at the start of a marine transgression of that area. It is overlain by the Pika Formation or, in areas where the Pika is not present, by the Deadwood Formation. It thickens to the west where it grades into the Mount Whyte, Cathedral, Stephen, and Pika Formations. It thins eastward to zero in Saskatchewan.

References

Cambrian Alberta
Cambrian System of North America
Western Canadian Sedimentary Basin
Geologic formations of Alberta
Geologic formations of Canada